Jam Khairuddin Tamachi bin Jam Unar was the fourth ruler of Samma dynasty of Sindh, reigning from 1367 to 1379 AD.

History 
The army of Sultan Alauddin Khalji arrived in the vicinity of Bukkur, reconquered that fort, and prepared to go to Sehwan. A fight took place between them and the Samma, in which the latter were defeated. Jam Tamachi and his whole family was taken prisoner and carried to Delhi, where he had to live for many years in exile.

In the absence of their ruler, the people lived quietly around Tharri under Jam Tamachi’s brother Babinah son of Jam Unar, as their headman. After some years, Khairuddin son of Jam Tamachi, who in his infancy had gone with his father to Delhi, was permitted to return to Sindh after his father’s death and was to be the chief of his tribe. Accordingly Jam Khairuddin came and took the helm of the government of his father’s country.

In a short time Sultan Muhammad bin Tughluq came to Sindh via Gujrat, in pursuit of the rebel Taghi. Muhammad bin Tughluq wanted to see Jam Khairuddìn, but the latter avoided meeting him, as he had for years remained a prisoner with him. Angered by the act, Sultan attacked Sindh but died in the vicinity of Thatta. Sultan was succeeded by his cousin Firuz Shah Tughluq, who hastened to Delhi without conquering Sindh. Jam Khairuddin followed him to Sann near Sehwan, returned to his capital, and commenced ruling the country quietly and justly.

An example of his justice may be given here.

 It is said that one day, going with a cavalcade, he passed through a desert, where he saw a heap of human bones. He halted for a few minutes and remarked to his followers that the bones were appealing to him for a just inquiry into their case. He sent for an old man living in a neighboring village and by making minute inquiries from him and others. He learned that seven years before a party of travelers coming from Gujarat to Sindh had been robbed and murdered by a band of robbers. He then secured some of the property of which they had been robbed, with the robbers. He sent the same to the ruler of Gujarat so that the robbers be punished by him. At his death Jam Khairuddin was succeeded by his son Jam Babino bin Jam Khairuddin.

See also 
 Noori Jam Tamachi

External links
 History of Sind, Volume II, translated from Persian by Mirza Kalichbeg Fredunbeg, chpt. 06

Pakistani royalty
History of Sindh
Jamote people